Sasher-Gaye Henry (born 9 November 1979 in Saint Andrew Parish, Jamaica) is a Jamaican former international netball player and current co-coach of the Jamaica national netball team, the Sunshine Girls. Henry won a bronze medal in netball at the 2014 Commonwealth Games in Glasgow. She was appointed co-head coach of the Sunshine Girls in 2017, along with Marvette Anderson, after the resignation of previous coach Jermaine Allison-McCracken. Henry and Anderson coached the Sunshine Girls to another bronze medal at the 2018 Commonwealth Games in the Gold Coast, Australia.

References

Jamaican netball players
Netball coaches
Commonwealth Games bronze medallists for Jamaica
Commonwealth Games medallists in netball
Netball players at the 2014 Commonwealth Games
1979 births
Living people
2007 World Netball Championships players
2011 World Netball Championships players
People from Saint Andrew Parish, Jamaica
Medallists at the 2014 Commonwealth Games